Bertram Hector "Bert" Macdonald (25 May 1902 – 28 December 1965) was a British long-distance runner. He was born in Kings Norton, Birmingham and died in Wellesbourne. MacDonald competed for Great Britain in the 1924 Summer Olympics held in Paris, France in the 3000 metre team where he won the silver medal with his teammates Herbert Johnston and George Webber.

References

External links
 Bertram Macdonald. Sports Reference. Retrieved on 2015-02-01.

1902 births
1965 deaths
People from Kings Norton
Sportspeople from Birmingham, West Midlands
English male long-distance runners
Olympic athletes of Great Britain
Olympic silver medallists for Great Britain
Athletes (track and field) at the 1924 Summer Olympics
Medalists at the 1924 Summer Olympics
Olympic silver medalists in athletics (track and field)